Rajat Chaudhuri is an Indian novelist and short story writer. He is the author of the critically acclaimed works Hotel Calcutta (2013), a short story cycle; The Butterfly Effect (2018), the novel Amber Dusk (2007) and other books. He is also an environment  columnist, book reviewer and literary critic. His fiction blends persuasive storytelling  with experiments in genre, structure, form while addressing themes like climate change, biotechnology, urbanism, and genetic engineering. His fiction has been featured in the climate change video game Survive the Century.

Early life and education 
Rajat Chaudhuri grew up and lives in Kolkata. He attended school at Ramakrishna Mission Vidyalaya and studied Economics at University of Calcutta.

Career
He is a bilingual writer writing in English and Bengali. His books include the novel Amber Dusk (2007), the short story cycle Hotel Calcutta (2013), and Calculus (2014), a collection of Bengali short stories.

He is the Charles Wallace Creative Writing Fellow (2014) of the University of Chichester, United Kingdom, Hawthornden Castle Fellow, Scotland, United Kingdom, and a past of Fellow of Sangam House International Writers’ Residency (2010), India. He is a Korean Arts Council-InKo sponsored resident writer (2013) of Toji Cultural Centre, which was set up by acclaimed Korean novelist Park Kyung-ni.

His fiction, criticism and essays have appeared in publications including Indian Literature (Sahitya Akademi), Asian Review of Books (Hong Kong), American Book Review (University of Houston-Victoria), Thresholds (University of Chichester), Eclectica, and Outlook magazine.

Chaudhuri has been involved with environment and development related activism and has contributed to the United Nations Development Programme's Human Development Report. He lobbies for and supports environment related causes.

He has worked for and nurtured development, environment and consumer rights groups, and has spoken about environment and sustainable consumption issues in venues within and outside the country. He has published books, monographs and papers on such topics as the right to water, sustainable food futures, sustainable consumption, and green advertisements.

Chaudhuri has also served as the developing country (Southern) coordinator on the United Nations Commission on Sustainable Development (UNCSD) NGO caucus for climate change and energy.  He has appeared in environment, science fiction and international cultural meetings and communication fora like Escape Velocity organised by Museum of Science Fiction in Washington D.C., International Communication Association (ICA) events and other places speaking about biotechnology in fiction, sustainability narratives and allied issues while doing readings from his books. Chaudhuri has lectured and spoken to different  audiences on the role of literature and storytelling in understanding and engaging with the climate crisis in programmes of the University of Oxford, Open University (UK) and University of London (School of Advanced Study).

The Butterfly Effect 
At the centre of a near-future, post-apocalyptic Darkland is the chaotic city of Calcutta. Here Captain Old, a retired policeman who is also a hired assassin receives news that could help unravel the roots of a scourge that has devastated the continent. But problems begin to pile up for him till his own life is at stake. In another narrative we find a group of Indian tourists disappearing in Korea and a detective arriving in Seoul to investigate. But soon the private eye is overwhelmed by incidents that is far beyond his ken as a crime investigator.

Meanwhile in England there is a hotshot geneticist working away on a secret project which he believes could change the world. Each of these distinct but interconnected narratives, arranged in a Russian doll structure, mingle with each other as we near the resolution of this work of speculative fiction which balances science, spirituality and a gentle way of life. This novel has been compared to Philip K. Dick's Blade Runner (based on Dick's 1968 novel Do Androids Dream of Electric Sheep?) for its dystopian settings. This book has been listed by Book Riot community as one of "50 must-read novels about eco-disaster".

The Butterfly Effect is a novel about the effect of intertwined disasters. In an interview to researcher and author Sami Ahmad Khan published in the book Star Warriors of the Modern Raj-Materiality, Mythology and Technology of Indian Science Fiction (University of Wales Press) Chaudhuri, speaking about genetic engineering has said, 'A GM mediated disaster could quickly go out of hand especially if it happens in the backdrop of major natural catastrophes (climate related) or say war...'

Multispecies Cities: Solarpunk Urban Futures 
A co-edited collection of short stories with multispecies and solarpunk themes. The editors who also contributed to the book’s introduction are Christoph Ruprecht, Deborah Cleland, Norie Tamura, Rajat Chaudhuri and Sarena Ulibarri. 
This anthology of short stories addresses multispecies justice and Solarpunk futures in urban settings of Asia-Pacific and beyond. This book has stories by Priya Sarukkai Chabria, N. R. M. Roshak, Meyari McFarland, Kate V. Bui, Avital Balwit, D.A. Xiaolin Spires, Timothy Yam, Joyce Chng, Caroline M. Yoachim, Vlad-Andrei Cucu, Joseph F. Nacino, Natsumi Tanaka, Phoebe Wagner, Eliza Victoria, Taiyo Fujii, Sarah E. Stevens, Joel R Hunt, Rimi B. Chatterjee, Andrew Dana Hudson, Amin Chehelnabi,
Octavia Cade, E.H. Nießler, Shweta Taneja and D.K. Mok.
The book is on Grist magazine’s `The Definitive Climate Fiction Reading List'.  The book is a finalist, shortlisted for the Utopia Awards.

Calcutta Nights 
Translated work of narrative nonfiction originally written in Bengali (titled Raater Kolkata) by author Hemendra Kumar Roy in the year 1923. Translated into English by Rajat Chaudhuri, Calcutta Nights is the real-life account of the night-time wanderings of author Hemendra Kumar Roy in the forbidden, dangerous and exciting places of the city of Calcutta. The chapters in the book cover the brothels of Calcutta's red-light district, the dens of hoodlums, the crematoriums, night-time theatres, beggars hovels, festive streets, the `white town' area of Esplanade, hotels among others. The book according to reports `reveals Calcutta's best kept secrets' and acts like a `guidebook to the dark dens of eeriness' of the city of Calcutta. The South China Morning Post in its review, described this book as `a 1920s tour through the seedy nightlife of Calcutta in this tale of beauty and decadence'.

Hotel Calcutta 
An old Calcutta hotel is under the threat of demolition from land sharks who want to replace it with a shopping mall. At this time a monk appears and prophesies that the hotel can be saved if people tell stories within its four walls every day. Thus begins a chain of storytelling by guests and hotel staff which brings together realistic and speculative storytelling traditions. The frame story of the hotel's possible demolition flows parallelly till in the final pages there is an unexpected resolution. This book has been mentioned by critics for its evocative descriptions and the magic of storytelling. The book has been noted for its visceral urbanism by academics and critics.

Amber Dusk 
Amber Dusk is a cross-cultural novel set in Calcutta and Paris amidst the rapid economic changes of a newly liberalised India. The young Rishi, in love with the French photographer Valence, travels west for work. Meanwhile, his friend, the hardnosed Pedro Braganza, looking for the good life, is taking too many chances in Calcutta.

While in Paris, Rishi gets drawn into a vortex of racism and sporadic violence unleashed on the city by a little known neo-Nazi white supremacist outfit. Pedro has been putting in place his get-rich-quick plans and the initial success goes to his head. Then something happens which puts the two friends on a collision course against each other. It will be difficult for both of them to come out of it unscathed.

The novel was welcomed by critics for exploring surrealistic themes and for its handling of cross-cultural themes.

The Best Asian Speculative Fiction 

An edited anthology of speculative stories from all over Asia selected, edited and introduced by Rajat Chaudhuri, the book covers science fiction, fantasy, horror, weird and other sub-genres of speculative fiction from authors in more than a dozen Asian countries.

The book has been described as "one of the most comprehensive speculative fiction collection from the continent." The critic for The Telegraph describes this book of stories as being at "the brink of a strange new world" and as a "necessary and successful conglomerate." The literary commentator Agnes S. K. Yeow  writing in Southeast Asian Review of English (SARE) has described the book as `An important contribution to an ever-expanding and dynamic literary form'.

The Great Bengali Poetry Underground 
An anthology of one hundred poems selected, introduced and translated from the original Bengali by Rajat Chaudhuri. The ten poets included in the volume are from India and Bangladesh. This collection brings together poetry which has not been well-represented in the mainstream literature of Bengali and the work of these poets is "rarely available in other languages".

The focus of the anthology is on poets who often publish in the so-called `little magazines’ both in print and online. The poems of this anthology are from the underground poetry movements of the Bengali language covering a selection of poets who are currently active.  Among the poets included are Pratyush Bandopadhyay, Arpan Chakrabarty, Mitul Dutta, Novera Hossain, Tanmay Mridha, Agni Roy and others. According to a critic "this galaxy of underground poets of Bengal emerge from this book as truth-tellers and myth-busters".

Calculus 
Calculus is a collection of short fiction written in Bengali. Set in the city of Calcutta and its outskirts these stories bring together characters like autorickshaw drivers who speak a dead language, tantric practitioners with secret agendas, occult detectives and more which finally portray hidden facets of the city and its people.

Critics have described the stories as postmodernist and magical, with one critic saying the book "transports us to a symbolic plane of existence, perched between the possible and the impossible."

Fellowships and awards 
 Hawthornden Fellow, Scotland, UK, 2015
 Charles Wallace Creative Writing Fellow at University of Chichester, United Kingdom, 2014
 Arts Council Korea and InKo Fellow at Toji Cultural Centre, South Korea, 2013 (Writer-in-Residence)
 Sangam House Fellow 2010 at Nrityagram, Bangalore, India

Bibliography 

 Calcutta Nigts (2020) 
 The Butterfly Effect (2018) 
 The Best Asian Speculative Fiction (Edited) (2018) 
 The Great Bengali Poetry Underground (Translated) (2021) 
 Amber Dusk (2007) 
 Hotel Calcutta (2013) 
 Calculus (2013) 
 Water – What are our Rights to it? 
 Green Advertisements – Are they Telling the Truth (co-author)

See also
 List of Indian writers

References

External links 
 Rajat Chaudhuri's official website
 Rajat Chaudhuri at The Internet Speculative Fiction Database

Living people
Year of birth missing (living people)
Writers from Kolkata
English-language writers from India